Glan-y-wern is a hamlet in the  community of Borth, Ceredigion, Wales, which is 78.2 miles (125.9 km) from Cardiff and 179.6 miles (289 km) from London. Glan-y-wern is represented in the Senedd by Elin Jones (Plaid Cymru) and is part of the Ceredigion constituency in the House of Commons.

References

See also
List of localities in Wales by population 

Villages in Ceredigion